Oleksandr Ivaniukhin is a Paralympian athlete from Ukraine competing mainly in category T11 sprint events.

He competed in the 2000 Summer Paralympics in Sydney, Australia.  There he won a silver medal in the men's Pentathlon - P11 event, a bronze medal in the men's 100 metres - T11 event, finished fifth in the men's Long jump - F11 event and finished fifth in the men's Triple jump - F11 event.  He also competed at the 2004 Summer Paralympics in Athens, Greece.    There he won a bronze medal in the men's 200 metres - T11 event, finished fourth in the men's 100 metres - T11 event and finished fourth in the men's 400 metres - T11 event. In the 2008 Summer Paralympics in Beijing, China he won a bronze medal in the men's 400 metres - T11 event, went out in the quarter-finals of the men's 100 metres - T11 event and finished eighth in the men's 200 metres - T11 event

External links
 

Paralympic athletes of Ukraine
Athletes (track and field) at the 2000 Summer Paralympics
Athletes (track and field) at the 2004 Summer Paralympics
Athletes (track and field) at the 2008 Summer Paralympics
Paralympic silver medalists for Ukraine
Paralympic bronze medalists for Ukraine
Living people
Medalists at the 2000 Summer Paralympics
Medalists at the 2004 Summer Paralympics
Medalists at the 2008 Summer Paralympics
Year of birth missing (living people)
Paralympic medalists in athletics (track and field)
Ukrainian male sprinters
Visually impaired sprinters
Paralympic sprinters
20th-century Ukrainian people
21st-century Ukrainian people